Eucalyptus aspratilis, commonly known as the soak yate or inland mallee-yate, is a mallee that is endemic to Western Australia. It has rough bark near its base, smooth silvery greyish bark above, lance-shaped adult leaves, pendulous buds in groups of seven, pale yellow or cream-coloured flowers and cylindrical fruit.

Description
It has rough, scaly to ribbony greyish brown bark on the lower park of its trunks and smooth silvery grey bark above, or sometimes throughout. Flowering occurs from May to August and the flowers are pale yellow to cream-coloured, or yellowish green.

Taxonomy and naming
Eucalyptus aspratilis was first formally described in 1993 by Lawrie Johnston and Ken Hill. The specific epithet (aspratilis) is a Latin word meaning "rough" or "scaly", referring to the bark on the lower part of the trunk of this mallee.

Distribution
Soak yate is found amongst granite outcrops in the Great Southern and southern Goldfields-Esperance regions of Western Australia where it grows in sandy soils. It is most commonly found in an area between Coolgardie, south to Norseman and west to Southern Cross.

Conservation
This eucalypt is classified as "not threatened" by the Western Australian Government Department of Parks and Wildlife.

See also

List of Eucalyptus species

References

Eucalypts of Western Australia
Trees of Australia
aspratilis
Myrtales of Australia
Plants described in 1992
Taxa named by Lawrence Alexander Sidney Johnson
Taxa named by Ken Hill (botanist)